Yangjae Citizen's Forest (Maeheon) Station is a subway station in Seoul, South Korea, on Seoul Metropolitan Subway's Shinbundang Line. It opened on October 28, 2011. The subway station appears in episode 1 of the Netflix TV show Squid Game where the main character Gi-hun, is recruited into the death games.

Naming
It is named for the nearby Yangjae Citizens' Forest which is located near Yangjae Tollgate on the Gyeongbu Highway, the entrance to Seoul City.

Yangjae Stream
Yangjae Stream, or Yangjaecheon in Korean, is a —long body of water that stretches from Gwanak-san through the southern area of Gangnam Station and Gangnam-gu. There are two swimming areas for kids, a number of stepping stone bridges to cross, and two sites for an ecosystem watch.

Station layout

Exits
Five exits:
 NW corner of Gangnam-daero and Maeheon-ro
 NE corner of Gangnam-daero and Maeheon-ro
 SE corner of Gangnam-daero and Maeheon-ro
 SW corner of Gangnam-daero and Maeheon-ro
 Maeheon-ro west of Gangnam-daero (the entrance of the forest)

References

Seoul Metropolitan Subway stations
Railway stations opened in 2011
Metro stations in Seocho District